Secrets of a Restaurant Chef is an American cooking television series that aired on Food Network. It was presented by chef Anne Burrell; and the series featured Burrell demonstrating how to cook restaurant-quality meals at home.

Secrets of a Restaurant Chef officially premiered on June 29, 2008, and concluded on April 1, 2012, after nine seasons.

Episodes

Awards and nominations

References

External links
 
 

2000s American cooking television series
2010s American cooking television series
2008 American television series debuts
2012 American television series endings
English-language television shows
Food Network original programming
Food reality television series
Television shows filmed in New York City